Renato Augusto Santos Júnior (born 29 January 1992 in Caieiras) is a Brazilian footballer who plays as a defensive midfielder for Shimizu S-Pulse in the J1 League.

Honours
Palmeiras
Campeonato Brasileiro Série B: 2013

References

External links

1992 births
Living people
People from Caieiras
Brazilian footballers
Association football midfielders
Campeonato Brasileiro Série A players
Campeonato Brasileiro Série B players
Sociedade Esportiva Palmeiras players
J1 League players
Joinville Esporte Clube players
Primeira Liga players
Moreirense F.C. players
Associação Atlética Ponte Preta players
Figueirense FC players
Paysandu Sport Club players
Brazilian expatriate footballers
Brazilian expatriate sportspeople in Portugal
Expatriate footballers in Portugal
Expatriate footballers in Japan
Shimizu S-Pulse players
Footballers from São Paulo (state)